The UEFA Nations League is a biennial international football competition contested by the senior men's national teams of the member associations of UEFA, the sport's European governing body.

The first tournament began in September 2018. The four group winners from League A qualified for the finals, played in Portugal in June 2019.

The competition replaces the international friendly matches previously played on the FIFA International Match Calendar, with European national teams engaging in more frequent competitive matches against other European national teams of comparable level.

Adoption
In October 2013, Norwegian Football Association President Yngve Hallén confirmed that talks had been held to create a third full national-team international tournament for UEFA members in addition to the FIFA World Cup and UEFA European Championship.

The concept of the UEFA Nations League would see all UEFA's member associations' national teams divided into a series of groups based upon a ranking formulated using their recent results, where they would be promoted and relegated to other groups according to their results within the group. The proposed tournament would take place on dates on the FIFA International Match Calendar that were previously allocated for international friendlies and would not affect the FIFA World Cup or UEFA European Championship.

In March 2014, UEFA general secretary Gianni Infantino stated that one of the benefits of the proposal would be to help less glamorous national associations arrange games.

The Royal Belgian Football Association's general secretary Steven Martens said that lower ranked nations would still benefit financially from the competition, as the television contract with UEFA would be centralised. The UEFA Nations League was unanimously adopted by the 54 UEFA member associations at the XXXVIII Ordinary UEFA Congress in Astana on 27 March 2014.

Format

Original format
According to the approved format, the 54 UEFA national teams were divided into four divisions (called "Leagues"): 12 teams in League A, 12 teams in League B, 14 teams in League C, and 16 teams in League D. In each league, four groups were formed (with three or four teams) and teams played each other both home and away.

Adjustment starting from 2020–21
After the completion of the first season, UEFA decided to adjust the format of the Nations League starting from the 2020–21 season. The new league structure comprised 16 teams in Leagues A, B and C and seven teams in League D.

The transition to the new format occurred by making various one-time changes after the 2018–19 season, namely the suspension of relegations in both League A and League B, the promotion of the two best teams per group in both League C and League D (instead of only one team per group), and the promotion of the best third-placed team from League D.

This change to the format followed a collective consultation process, whereby all UEFA national associations reiterated their intent to further reduce the number of friendly matches. The number of competitive matches was increased from 142 to 168, thus increasing the commercial value and viewer attractiveness of the competition. Almost all teams in the same group played their last match simultaneously with the aim of promoting fairness. More matches were played within Leagues A and B, with the two leagues now incorporating competition between the 32 highest-ranked UEFA national associations, instead of the previous system where Leagues A and B together only incorporated 24 of the highest-ranked UEFA national associations.

Finals, promotion and relegation
In the top league, League A, the winners of the four groups go on to play in the Nations League Finals, with two semi-finals, one third and fourth place decider, and one final to decide which team becomes the UEFA Nations League champion.

Teams can also be promoted and relegated to a higher or lower league. Starting in 2020–21, each group winner in Leagues B, C, and D is automatically promoted to the next higher league while those placing last in its group in the Leagues A and B is automatically relegated to the next lower league for the next tournament. From 2020–21 to 2022–23, the two League C teams that are to be relegated are determined by play-outs beginning in March of even-numbered years. Based on the Nations League overall ranking of the fourth-placed teams, the first-ranked team face the fourth-ranked team, and the second-ranked team face the third-ranked team. Two ties are played over two legs, with the higher-ranked team hosting the second leg. The two teams that win on aggregate remain in League C, while the losing teams are relegated to League D. If the aggregate score is level, extra time will be played (the away goals rule is not applied). If still tied after extra time, a penalty shoot-out will be used to decide the winner. The away goals was originally to be used, but was abolished by the UEFA Executive Committee on 16 December 2021.

Starting in 2024–25, as League C has four groups while League D has only two, the two worst-ranked League C teams will automatically be relegated (a change from the previous editions, which featured relegation play-outs between the fourth-placed teams of League C). Furthermore, promotion/relegation play-offs will also be introduced, with the third-placed teams of League A facing the runners-up of League B, and the third-placed teams of League B facing the runners-up of League C. The matches will be played home-and-away over two legs in March 2025, with the winners going to the higher league and the losers entering the lower league. In all cases, the higher-ranked team hosts the second leg. If the aggregate score is level, extra time will be played (the away goals rule is not applied). If still tied after extra time, a penalty shoot-out will be used to decide the winner. The away goals was originally to be used, but was abolished by the UEFA Executive Committee on 16 December 2021.

UEFA European Championship link

The UEFA Nations League is linked with the UEFA European Championship qualifying, providing teams another chance to qualify for the UEFA European Championship.

There were play-offs for each of Leagues A, B, C, and D in October and November 2020. Each group winner earned a spot in the semi-finals. If the group winner was already one of the 20 qualified teams, rankings were used to give the play-off spot to another team of that league. If fewer than four teams in the entire league remained unqualified, play-off spots for that league were given to teams of the next lower league. This determined the four remaining qualifying spots for the European Championship (out of 24 total). However, starting with UEFA Euro 2024 onward,  the now-downsized League D will no longer be given its own path. Instead, if any of Leagues A, B, or C have fewer than four teams that did not qualify directly for Euro 2024, the best-ranked group winner of League D will advance to the play-offs (unless that team already qualified for the final tournament). The remaining spots will be allocated based on the Nations League overall ranking, however, group winners from Leagues A, B, and C cannot face teams from a higher league. Therefore, additional teams from League D can only advance to the play-offs if enough teams from League C qualify directly.

FIFA World Cup link

The Nations League was linked with European qualification for the 2022 FIFA World Cup, although to a lesser degree than the UEFA European Championship qualifying play-offs. The first round of 2022 World Cup qualification consisted of ten groups. The winner of each group directly qualified for the World Cup. Then, the second round (which followed a play-off format) was contested by the ten group runners-up, plus the best two Nations League group winners (based on the Nations League overall ranking) that finished outside the top two of their qualifying group. The play-offs were split into three play-off paths, played in two semi-finals (hosted by the six best-ranked runners-up of the qualifying group stage) and the final (with the home teams to be drawn), from which an additional three teams also qualified.

In an interview with Polish website meczyki.pl, UEFA vice-president Zbigniew Boniek said that all 10 teams from CONMEBOL, the South American Football Confederation, would join the UEFA Nations League from the 2024–25 edition of the competition.

Trophy
The UEFA Nations League trophy was unveiled during the phase draw in Lausanne, Switzerland. The trophy represents all 55 UEFA National associations and is made of sterling silver. The trophy weighs 7.5 kg and is 71 cm tall.

Anthem
The official anthem of the UEFA Nations League was recorded with the Netherlands Radio Philharmonic Orchestra and Choir, singing in Latin. It is a mix of classical and electronic music, and is played when the players are entering the field of play, in television sequences and for ceremonial purposes. The composers are Giorgio Tuinfort and Franck van der Heijden.

Seasons
Each season of the UEFA Nations League is typically played from September to November of an even-numbered year (league phase), and June of the following odd-numbered year (Nations League Finals of League A), meaning a UEFA Nations League champion is crowned every two years. An exception will be made in the 2022–23 season when the league phase will be played in June and September 2022, due to the 2022 FIFA World Cup played in Qatar at the end of the year.

Results

Finals

Performances by team

* = hosts

Team performances
 – Champions
 – Runners-up
 – Third place
 – Fourth place
 – Promoted
* – Promoted after format change
 – No movement
* – Originally relegated, spared after format change (no movement)
 – Relegated
Q – Qualified for upcoming UEFA Nations League Finals
R - In playoff to avoid relegation from League C
 – Host country of UEFA Nations League Finals

Reactions

Support
UEFA devised the tournament as a means to eliminate international friendlies – an aim that has been shared by many football clubs and supporters, with the regular football season being interrupted with non-competitive international matches as part of the FIFA International Match Calendar.

In February 2012, it was agreed between UEFA and the European Club Association (ECA) that the international friendly schedule would be reduced from 12 to 9 matches a year with the August round of international friendlies in the UEFA confederation abolished from 2015. The aspiration to eliminate friendlies in favour of a more competitive tournament has been both welcomed and criticised by many football commentators.

Criticism
The format has been criticised for allowing weaker teams to qualify through the Nations League to compete in the European Championship finals, instead of qualifying through the standard qualification process. However, once the tournament began in 2018, it got applause for "very high-level matches" and impressive turnouts in the initial round of fixtures.

Influence
Shortly after the foundation of the UEFA Nations League, CONCACAF, inspired by its success, announced that a similar competition format, the CONCACAF Nations League, would be established. The first edition was played in 2018. Also inspired by the recent success of the Nations League, the AFC had begun to formalise a similar competition, planned to begin in 2021 before being stalled due to the effect of the COVID-19 pandemic.

See also
 CONCACAF Nations League
 UEFA Women's Nations League

References

External links

 

 
Nations League
2018 establishments in Europe
Recurring sporting events established in 2018